Mian Mohammad Sharif (Urdu:محمد شریف  )  (1965 – 1893) TI was a Pakistani philosopher, Islamic scholar, and college professor. He is noted for his work in analytical philosophy and pioneered the idea of Muslim philosophy. His work was published in international philosophical journals.

He remained politically active with the Muslim League and advocated for the idea of establishing a separate state in British India, meaning a separate new state of Pakistan for the Muslims. He remained a member of the Islamic Ideology Council and taught at Islamia College, Lahore for the rest of his life.

Early life and career
Mian Mohammad Sharif was born in the suburban area of Lahore, situated in Shalimar Garden of Lahore, British Punjab, British Indian Empire, in 1893.

Sharif was educated at the Muhammadan Anglo-Oriental College, Aligarh and the Aligarh Muslim University (AMU) where he studied Philosophy. He received a BA degree in Philosophy from the AMU before moving to the United Kingdom for higher education. Settled at the Cambridge, Sharif began attending the graduate school of philosophy at Cambridge University where he completed his MA and did his doctoral studies under English philosopher G. E. Moore.

His interest in realism and analytic philosophy widened and  Sharif wrote on Monadism which was supervised by Moore as his PhD thesis. After receiving his PhD, his interest shifted to Western Philosophy and he said "Philosophy must find a place for the sciences in the systematic whole of knowledge."

After returning to British India, he chaired the philosophy department of the AMU and briefly participated in the Pakistan Movement. In 1945, he was appointed President of the Indian Philosophical Congress until  he moved to Lahore to accept the professorship of philosophy at the Punjab University. In 1950, he founded and served as the first president of'Pakistan Philosophical Congress, and remained associated with the society for the rest of his life. This organisation played a role in reviving interest in the study of modern philosophy. In addition, he also served as principal of Islamia College, Lahore and Director of the Institute of Islamic Culture based in Lahore. In 1956, he represented Pakistan in the UNESCO conference held in the United States. He was a member of the American Philosophical Association (Pacific Division) and a Director of the International Federation of Philosophical Societies, Paris. He already was the Founder-Life-President of the Pakistan Philosophical Congress. Sharif died and was buried in Lahore in 1965.

References

Annotations and bibliography
 
 

1893 births
1965 deaths
20th-century Pakistani philosophers
Analytic philosophers
Aligarh Muslim University alumni
Alumni of the University of Cambridge
20th-century Muslim scholars of Islam
Pakistan Movement activists
Academic staff of Aligarh Muslim University
Pakistani Muslims
People from Lahore
Philosophers of language
Punjabi people
Recipients of Tamgha-e-Imtiaz
Members of the Pakistan Philosophical Congress
Academic staff of the University of the Punjab